Ferrous oxalate (iron(II) oxalate) is an inorganic compound with the formula FeC2O4 where  is typically 2. These are orange compounds, poorly soluble in water.

Structure
The dihydrate FeC2O4 is a coordination polymer, consisting of chains of oxalate-bridged ferrous centers, each with two aquo ligands.

When heated, it dehydrates and decomposes into a mixture of iron oxides and pyrophoric iron metal, with release of carbon dioxide, carbon monoxide, and water.

Natural occurrence
Anhydrous iron(II) oxalate is as yet (2020) unknown among minerals. However, the dihydrate is known, as humboldtine. A related, though much more complex mineral is stepanovite,
Na[Mg(H2O)6][Fe3+(C2O4)3]·3H2O - an example of trioxalatoferrate(III).

See also
A number of other iron oxalates are known
 Iron(III) oxalate
 Potassium ferrioxalate
 Sodium ferrioxalate

References

Iron(II) compounds
Oxalates
Inorganic compounds